Gold, also called golden, is a color tone resembling the gold chemical element.

The web color gold is sometimes referred to as golden to distinguish it from the color metallic gold. The use of gold as a color term in traditional usage is more often applied to the color "metallic gold" (shown below).

The first recorded use of golden as a color name in English was in 1300 to refer to the element gold. The word gold as a color name was first used in 1400 and in 1423 to refer to blond hair.

Metallic gold, such as in paint, is often called goldtone or gold tone, or gold ground when describing a solid gold background. In heraldry, the French word or is used. In model building, the color gold is different from brass. A shiny or metallic silvertone object can be painted with transparent yellow to obtain goldtone, something often done with Christmas decorations.

Metallic gold

Gold (metallic gold) 

At right is displayed a representation of the color metallic gold (the color traditionally known as gold) which is a simulation of the color of the actual metallic element gold itself—gold shade.

The source of this color is the ISCC-NBS Dictionary of Color Names (1955), a color dictionary used by stamp collectors to identify the colors of stamps—See color sample of the color Gold (Color Sample Gold (T) #84) displayed on indicated web page:

Web color gold vs. metallic gold 

The American Heritage Dictionary defines the color metallic gold as "A light olive-brown to dark yellow, or a moderate, strong to vivid yellow."

Of course, the visual sensation usually associated with the metal gold is its metallic shine. This cannot be reproduced by a simple solid color, because the shiny effect is due to the material's reflective brightness varying with the surface's angle to the light source.

This is why, in art, a metallic paint that glitters in an approximation of real gold would be used; a solid color like that of the cell displayed in the adjacent box does not aesthetically "read" as gold. Especially in sacral art in Christian churches, real gold (as gold leaf) was used for rendering gold in paintings, e.g. for the halo of saints. Gold can also be woven into sheets of silk to give an East Asian traditional look.

More recent art styles, e.g. art nouveau, also made use of a metallic, shining gold; however, the metallic finish of such paints was added using fine aluminum powder and pigment rather than actual gold.

Shades

Old gold 

Old gold is a dark yellow, which varies from heavy olive or olive brown to deep or strong yellow. The widely accepted color old gold is on the darker rather than the lighter side of this range.

The first recorded use of old gold as a color name in English was in the early 19th century (exact year uncertain). The official colors of Alpha Phi Alpha fraternity, founded in 1906 are black and old gold. The Delta Sigma Pi fraternity, founded in 1907, official colors are designated royal purple and old gold and Pi Kappa Alpha fraternity's colors are garnet and old gold.

Maroon and old gold are the colors of Texas State University's intercollegiate sports teams. Old Gold and black are the team colors of Purdue University Boilermakers intercollegiate sports teams. The Georgia Tech Yellow Jackets formerly wore white and old gold (now called Tech Gold). The Wake Forest Demon Deacons, UCF Knights, and Vanderbilt Commodores wear old gold and black. The UAB Blazers team colors are Forest Green and Old Gold. The New Orleans Saints list their official team colors as black, old gold and white. Wolverhampton Wanderers F.C., an association football club in England, also traditionally features old gold and black uniforms.

Golden yellow 

Golden yellow is the color halfway between amber and yellow on the RGB color wheel. It is a color that is 87.5% yellow and 12.5% red.

The first recorded use of golden yellow as a color name in English was in the year 1597.

Golden Yellow is one of the colors of the United States Air Force, along with Ultramarine Blue.

Golden poppy 

Golden poppy is a tone of gold that is the color of the California poppy—the official state flower of California—the Golden State.

The first recorded use of golden poppy as a color name in English was in 1927.

Arizona State University (ASU) Gold 

Gold is the oldest color associated with Arizona State University and dates back to 1896 when the school was named the Tempe Normal School. Gold signifies the "golden promise" of ASU. Gold also signifies the sunshine Arizona is famous for, including the power of the sun and its influence on the climate and the economy. The student section, known as The Inferno, wears gold on game days.

University of Southern California (USC) Gold 

The official colors of the University of Southern California are Pantone 201C and Pantone 123C. These colors, designated as USC Cardinal and USC Gold, were adopted in 1895 by Rev. George W. White, USC's third president, and are equal in importance in identifying the USC Trojans.

California (Berkeley) Gold 

California Gold is one of the official colors of the University of California, Berkeley, as identified in their graphic style guide for use in on-screen representations of the gold color in the university's seal. For print media, the guide recommends to, "[u]se Pantone 7750 metallic or Pantone 123 yellow and 282 blue". The color is one of two most used by Berkeley, the other being Berkeley Blue; these, together, are the original colors of the University of California system, of which variations of blue and gold can be found in each campus' school colors.

Cal Poly Pomona gold 

Cal Poly Pomona gold was one of the two official colors of California State Polytechnic University, Pomona (Cal Poly Pomona). The official university colors were green (PMS 349) and gold (PMS 131). Cal Poly Pomona's Office of Public Affairs created the colors for web development and has technical guidelines, copyright and privacy protection; as well as logos and images that developers are asked to follow in the University's Guidelines for using official Cal Poly Pomona logos. If web developers are using gold on a university website, they were encouraged to use Cal Poly Pomona gold. Cal Poly Pomona has adopted a new brand color palette including a different gold color: #FFB500. The logo of the Cal Poly Pomona's athletic teams, the Cal Poly Pomona Broncos, has changed in 2014 to reflect the new gold color, but is currently using #FFB718.

UCLA Gold 

The color was approved by the University of California, Los Angeles (UCLA) Chancellor in October 2013. This is a shade of gold identified by the university for use in their printed publications.

MU Gold 

MU Gold is used by the University of Missouri as the official school color along with black. Mizzou Identity Standards designated the color for web development as well as logos and images that developers are asked to follow in the University's Guidelines for using official Mizzou logos.

Pale gold 

The color pale gold is displayed at right.

This has been the color called gold in Crayola crayons since 1903.

Pale gold is one of the Lithuanian basketball club Lietkabelis Panevėžys primary colors.

Sunglow 

The color sunglow is displayed at right.

This is a Crayola crayon color formulated in 1990.

Harvest gold 

The color harvest gold is displayed at right.

This color was originally called harvest in the 1920s.

The first recorded use of harvest as a color name in English was in 1923.

Harvest gold was a common color for metal surfaces (including automobiles and household appliances), as was the color avocado, during the whole decade of the 1970s. They were both also popular colors for shag carpets. Both colors (as well as shag carpets) went out of style by the early 1980s.

Goldenrod 

Displayed at right is the web color goldenrod.

The color goldenrod is a representation of the color of some of the deeper gold colored goldenrod flowers.

The first recorded use of goldenrod as a color name in English was in 1915.

Vegas gold 

Displayed at right is the color Vegas gold.

Vegas gold, rendered within narrow limits, is associated with the glamorous casinos and hotels of the Las Vegas Strip, United States.

Vegas gold is one of the official athletic colors for the Notre Dame Fighting Irish, Boston College Eagles, Colorado Buffaloes, South Florida Bulls, St. Vincent–St. Mary High School, Vanderbilt Commodores, the United States Naval Academy Midshipmen, and Western Carolina University Catamounts. It is one of the official colors of the NHL's Vegas Golden Knights, and was the type of gold the Pittsburgh Penguins used on their uniforms until they reverted to "Pittsburgh gold", the shade traditionally associated with the city.

Satin sheen gold 

At right is displayed the color satin sheen gold. This is the name of the color of the Starfleet command personnel uniform worn by Captain Kirk of the USS Enterprise in the TV show and movies Star Trek.

Golden brown 

The first recorded use of golden brown as a color name in English was in the year 1891.  Golden brown is commonly referenced in recipes as the desired color of properly baked and fried foods.

Candlelight

Candlelight is a brilliant gold color.

Golden in nature 

Protista
 The golden algae or chrysophytes are a large group of heterokont algae, found mostly in freshwater.

Plants
 Golden bamboo (Phyllostachys aurea) is a bamboo species.
 The golden poppy and goldenrod are popular flowers to cultivate in horticulture.
 The Yukon Gold potato is a variety of potato recognizable through its smooth eyes and golden interior.

Animals
 The golden bamboo lemur (Hapalemur aureus) is a medium-sized bamboo lemur endemic to southeastern Madagascar.
 The golden eagle is a Northern Hemisphere bird of prey.
 The goldfish was one of the earliest fish to be domesticated, and is still one of the most commonly kept aquarium fish and water garden fish.
 The golden retriever is a medium-sized breed of dog that is one of the most popular companion animals.
 The golden toad was an amphibian that used to live in Costa Rica that is now extinct.

In culture

Art 
 Gold is a typical background color ("gold ground") in Byzantine art, as well as in the paintings of Gustav Klimt that took inspiration from Byzantine work.

Business 
 In advertising for the Union Pacific Railroad in the 1950s, the southwestern states of the United States served by the Union Pacific were collectively called The Golden Empire because the railroad's diesel engines were and are colored golden, red, and black. Ads with maps showing the Union Pacific's Golden Empire colored golden were placed in many popular mass-circulation magazines.

Exploration 
 On 26 September 1580, Sir Francis Drake returned to England, becoming the second person to circumnavigate the globe. His ship was called the Golden Hind.

Food 
 Golden rice is a variety of rice produced through genetic engineering to biosynthesize the precursors of beta-carotene (pro-vitamin A) in the edible parts of rice.
 Golden Oreos are composed of vanilla instead of chocolate cookies with a vanilla cream filling.
 Golden raisins are dried grapes that have been treated with sulfur dioxide and flame-dried.

Film and television 

 Kingsman: The Golden Circle is a 2017 spy film.
 The Golden Girls was a popular American television sitcom series.

Gemstones 
 South Sea Pearls, which have historically been cultured in the Indian and Pacific Oceans, in the countries of Myanmar, Indonesia, the Philippines, and Northern Australia but mostly attributed to the former thalassocratic Sultanate of Sulu have a gold colored variety from the Pinctada maxima Pearl oyster. This golden pearl is the national gemstone of the Philippines. This can now be manufactured in the laboratory at a much lower cost.

Interior design 

 The Chrysotriklinos (golden reception hall) throne room of the Byzantine Emperor in the Great Palace of Constantinople from its construction, in the late 6th century, until the 10th century
 The Queen's Bedchamber in the Grand appartement de la reine in the Versailles Palace is decorated in the color gold. This room was where Marie Antoinette, wife of King Louis XVI of France, slept.
 Golden is a warm color that can both provide not only a bright and cheerful feeling but also a somber, traditional, and religious aura. Golden tends to go well with earth colors, but it can also enrich a palette of red or burgundy.

Literature 
 Blonde hair in women (or sometimes men) is sometimes referred to poetically as golden.

Music 

 “Band of Gold” is a 1970 song by Freda Payne. The lyrics tell of a woman whose lover has left her, only leaving behind a gold wedding ring (the song's “band of gold”).
“Gold” is a 1983 song by Spandau Ballet.
 “We Are Golden” is a 2009 song by Mika from his album The Boy Who Knew Too Much.
 "Golden" is the 2020 song by Harry Styles.
 "Golden Brown" is a song by The Stranglers

Parapsychology 
 Psychics who claim to be able to observe the aura with their third eye report that great spiritual teachers usually have golden auras.
 People who have gold auras are said to be those whose pure intellect is applied to abstract philosophy and mathematics.

Politics 
 The Gold Shirts were a Mexican fascist party in the 1930s.
 Gold is often used as an official color by laissez-faire or libertarian political parties, such as the United States Libertarian Party, as well as ideologies such as voluntaryism and anarcho-capitalism, due to their frequent support for Austrian School economics and the gold standard.

Religion 

 The color golden is associated with Buddhism:
 Statues of Buddha are usually painted metallic gold, are made of the metal gold, or have gold plating.
 Theravada Buddhist monks wear saffron robes, a color close to golden.
 The Shwedagon Pagoda, in Yangon, Myanmar is plated in solid gold.
 The Golden Pavilion is a notable Buddhist temple in Kyoto, Kinki, Japan.
 The Secret of the Golden Flower is an important religious text in Daoism.
 The Golden Temple in Amritsar, Punjab, India, is the holiest site of the Sikh religion.
 The Golden Mosque in Samarra, Iraq, a Shiite Muslim holy site constructed in 944.
In Paganism, it is used for inner strength, self-realization, understanding, and intuition. It has a masculine energy and brings fortune and luck.

Sports 
 In association football, the Wolverhampton Wanderers traditionally uses "old gold" as its primary color, though the shade of the color is not quite metallic.
 In Major League Baseball, the Milwaukee Brewers, Oakland Athletics, and Pittsburgh Pirates use gold as one of their team's primary colors. The three teams utilize a more yellowish shade of the color. A Gold Glove Award is given to the best player at each fielding position in each major league.
 In the NBA, the Boston Celtics use "old gold" as an accent color. The Cleveland Cavaliers, Los Angeles Lakers, Indiana Pacers, Denver Nuggets, Golden State Warriors, Memphis Grizzlies, New Orleans Pelicans, Utah Jazz and Oklahoma City Thunder also use gold as an accent color, although the shade is mostly yellowish in appearance.
 Fans of the National Football League will note the Los Angeles Rams, Pittsburgh Steelers, Washington Commanders, Minnesota Vikings, Green Bay Packers, and Kansas City Chiefs as having gold as a color. The gold they use, however, is a distinctly more yellow color (akin to the non-metallic web color version) than the traditional "old gold" used by the New Orleans Saints and San Francisco 49ers. In both cases, the color is referred to as "gold", with the yellow shade sometimes referred to as "athletic gold" when distinguishing it from the metallic shades.
 In the NHL, eleven teams currently use a form of gold in their color schemes. The Boston Bruins are the oldest team to do so, and have always used a yellow "athletic" gold; they have even worn several gold sweaters throughout the years. Other teams using athletic gold include the St. Louis Blues, Buffalo Sabres (excluding the 1996–2006 period), Calgary Flames, Florida Panthers (who use a darker, more metallic shade in their logo) and Nashville Predators. Teams that have switched from athletic gold to a metallic shade include the Minnesota North Stars (now the Dallas Stars), Pittsburgh Penguins, and Anaheim Ducks. The Ottawa Senators and Minnesota Wild have always used metallic gold. In addition, the Los Angeles Kings and Vancouver Canucks have used versions of athletic gold in the past. The Kings, Canucks, and Penguins have also worn gold sweaters color in the past. For the 2014–15 season, the Penguins revived the black uniform the team wore during its first two championship seasons in 1991 and 1992, with the team's old shade of gold as an alternate uniform. When the team first switched from shades of blue to black and gold in 1980, the color scheme was similar to that of the Bruins, who protested the Penguins' new uniforms. The protest failed -- largely due to Pittsburgh having a tradition of sports teams wearing gold and black -- and the Penguins wore the shade of gold, now dubbed "Pittsburgh gold", until 2002 and once again in 2014.
 In college sports, the U.S. Military Academy and the U.S. Naval Academy use gold as a primary color.
 The Golden Gloves is the name given to annual competitions for amateur boxing in the United States.

State decorations 
 The Gold Star was the highest state decoration in the Soviet Union and remains so in several post-Soviet states.

Vexillology 
 Argentina, Brazil, Bolivia, Bosnia and Herzegovina, Belgium, Bhutan, China, Colombia, Egypt, Ecuador, Germany, Ghana, Malaysia, the Philippines Spain, Sri Lanka, Venezuela, Vietnam are examples of modern nations that use the color golden in their national flags.
 The Holy Roman Empire, which existed from 800 to 1806, had a golden flag with a black double-headed Imperial Eagle on the field, the origin of the use of the color in the German and Belgian flags.
 The Byzantine Empire from 1261 until its collapse in 1453 had a flag that had a black double-headed eagle on a field of golden. This flag is still used today as the flag of the Mount Athos autonomous region in Greece.
 The Flag of the Hispanic People (Bandera de la Raza) is an ethnic flag that is golden and purpure (purple) on a white field. It is also used as the flag of Hispanic America. (This flag is sometimes also called the Flag of the Americas when used on a non-ethnic basis to symbolically represent the combined geographical area of North America and South America together.)

Video games 

 Pokémon Gold (and its remake, Pokémon HeartGold) are entries in the Pokémon franchise of video games.
 Golden Sun is a series of role-playing games (RPGs).

Chemical compounds 
In addition to elemental gold, a number of compounds or alloys have a reflective gold hue:
Several brasses, specifically those rich (65%+ wt.) in copper. Prince's metal is a brass-based gold simulant.
Titanium nitride
Zirconium nitride

See also 

 Or
 List of colors

References

External links 
 

Quaternary colors
Symbols of California
Shades of yellow
Shades of orange
Gold